The 1915 U.S. National Championships (now known as the US Open) took place on the outdoor grass courts at the West Side Tennis Club, Forest Hills in New York City, United States. The men's singles tournament ran from 31 August until 8 September while the women's singles and doubles championship took place from 7 June to 12 June at the Philadelphia Cricket Club in Chestnut Hill. It was the 35th staging of the U.S. National Championships, the first held at Forest Hills and the second Grand Slam tennis event of the year.

Relocation to Forest Hills
In 1915 the national championship was relocated from Newport, Rhode Island to the West Side Tennis Club at Forest Hills, New York. Already in 1911 an effort was made by a group of tennis players, headed by Karl H. Behr from New York, to relocate the tournament to New York but by a vote of 95 to 60 it was decided to remain in Newport. In early 1915 the issue resurfaced when a group of about 100 tennis players signed a petition in favor of the move, arguing that most tennis clubs, players and fans were located in the New York area and that it would therefore be beneficial for the development of the sport to host the national championship there. This view was opposed by another group of players which included eight former national singles champions. The contentious issue was brought to a vote at the annual United States National Lawn Tennis Association (USNLTA) meeting on Feb 5, 1915 and with 128 votes in favor and 119 against it was decided to relocate to Forest Hills.

Finals

Men's singles

 William Johnston defeated  Maurice McLoughlin  1–6, 6–0, 7–5, 10–8

Women's singles

 Molla Bjurstedt defeated  Hazel Hotchkiss Wightman  4–6, 6–2, 6–0

Men's doubles
 William Johnston /  Clarence Griffin defeated  Maurice McLoughlin /  Tom Bundy 2–6, 6–3, 6–4, 3–6, 6–3

Women's doubles
 Hazel Wightman /  Eleonora Sears defeated  Helen Homans McLean /  G. L. Chapman 10–8, 6–2

Mixed doubles
 Hazel Wightman /  Harry Johnson defeated  Molla Bjurstedt /  Irving Wright 6–0, 6–1

References

External links
Official US Open website

 
U.S. National Championships
U.S. National Championships (tennis) by year
U.S. National Championships (tennis)
U.S. National Championships (tennis)
U.S. National Championships (tennis)
U.S. National Championships (tennis)
U.S. National Championships (tennis)
U.S. National Championships (tennis)